Emkendorf is a municipality in the district of Rendsburg-Eckernförde, in Schleswig-Holstein, Germany.

The location of Emkendorf is south of the municipality of Osterrönfeld, Schülldorf, Haßmoor or Westensee, but north of Bokel and Groß Vollstedt.

References

Municipalities in Schleswig-Holstein
Rendsburg-Eckernförde